Love Channel is a 2001 Tamil language romance film directed by R. N. Kumaresan. The film stars newcomer Eashwar and Monica, with V. S. Raghavan, Rajeev, Rajesh, R. Sundarrajan, Anand and Dhamu playing supporting roles. The film, produced by R. Guru Moorthy and K. Sabari Giri, was released on 22 June 2001.

Plot

The police Commissioner Arumugam (V.S. Raghavan) retires after many years of hard work. He has two sons Rajeev (Rajeev) and Ravi (Eashwar). Rajeev is married to Parimalam (Sadhana) and they have a teenage daughter. Ravi is an MBA graduate and he doesn't want to get married. Ravi's family finally find a bride for Ravi, and Rajeswari (Monica) becomes his fiancée but they have not seen each other. Later, Ravi finds a job in Germany and he left India. During the engagement ceremony, a fight breaks out between the two families and the engagement is eventually cancelled. To forget this incident, Rajeswari's grandfather brings Rajeswari to Germany. In Germany, Ravi and Rajeswari fall in love with each other. What transpires next forms the rest of the story.

Production
The film was shot in France, with lead actor Eashwar, who is a non-resident Indian, facilitating the shoot. Eashwar's father had been an actor in Tamil films and he was able to discuss the script with producers Gurumurthi and director R. N. Murugesan during their visit to Paris. After the completion of the shoot, Eashwar moved to Chennai to try and pursue a career in films, but was largely unsuccessful.

Cast

 Eashwar as Ravi (Ravikumar)
 Monica as Rajeswari
 V. S. Raghavan as Arumugam
 Rajeev as Rajeev
 Rajesh as Sethumadai Gounder
 R. Sundarrajan as Rajeswari's grandfather
 Anand as Anand
 Dhamu as Wilfred De Souza
 Crane Manohar as Aanazhagan
 Gemini Balaji as Annachi
 Anju Aravind as Shanthi
 Sadhana as Parimalam
 Scissor Manohar
 Kottai Perumal

Soundtrack

The film score and the soundtrack were composed by Deva. The soundtrack, released in 2001, features 6 tracks with lyrics written by Palani Bharathi, P. Vijay and Kalaikumar.

Release
Following the release of the film, Eashwar signed on to produce and appear in a film directed by Bharathi Ganesh, who had earlier made Kannupada Poguthaiya (1999). Titled Velayudham, the film featured Eashwar alongside Mammootty and Pratyusha but was later stalled.

References

2001 films
2000s Tamil-language films
Films scored by Deva (composer)
Films about Indian weddings
Indian romantic comedy films
2001 directorial debut films
2001 romantic comedy films